Máel Ísu mac in Chléirig Chuirr was a medieval Irish bishop: he was Bishop of Down from 1149 until his death in 1175. He was present at the Synod of Kells.

References

People from County Down
12th-century Roman Catholic bishops in Ireland
Bishops of Down
1175 deaths